Robert Blendu (born January 4, 1943) was a member of the Arizona State Senate from 2003 through 2009. He was first elected to the Senate in November 2002, and was re-elected twice, in 2004 and 2006.  In 2008 Blendu decided to not seek re-election to the Senate and ran for a seat in the Arizona House of Representatives in the same district.  However, he lost to Steve Montenegro and Jerry Weiers in the Republican primary.

References

Republican Party Arizona state senators
1943 births
Living people